Franke Wilmer (born December 2, 1950) is an academic and a politician. She was a Democratic member of the Montana House of Representatives, representing Districts 63 and 64 from 2007–2015. Before first running for office in 2006, Wilmer was appointed to chair the Montana Human Rights Commission by Governor Schweitzer in 2005. She received both a PhD and Masters from the University of Maryland in 1990 and is currently a full professor of Political Science at Montana State University.

Early life, education, and academic career
Wilmer was born in 1950 in Washington, D.C. to Marion and Bud Wilmer. Her father was a bricklayer from Baltimore and her mother was a nurse from Terry, Montana and Denton, Maryland. In the 1970s and 1980s, she was a single mother raising her one daughter, while working various jobs and earning three college degrees. Her jobs during this decade include waitress, carpenter, middle school substitute teacher, assistant professor, and research assistant. She graduated with a B.S. in political science and economics from Shepherd University in 1981. She got a master's degree in political science, specializing in international relations, from the University of Maryland in 1985 and a PhD in 1990.

After earning her degrees, she became an Assistant Professor at the University of South Carolina at Spartanburg for a year. In 1991, she was then hired by Montana State University and still teaches there today. That same year, she was a co-founder of the Gallatin Human Rights Task Force. She became an Associate Professor in 1996 and Full Professor and Head of the Political Science Department in 2001.

Early political career
She has written three books, numerous articles, and been invited to be guest lecturer across the world. She conducted field research in Yugoslavia during the war and Dayton Peace Accords.

In 2005, Democratic Governor Brian Schweitzer appointed her to become Chair the Montana Human Rights Commission, where she served for one year.

Montana House of Representatives

Elections
In 2006, incumbent Democratic State Representative Larry Jent, of Montana's 64th House District, decided to retire to run for a seat in the Montana House of Representatives. Wilmer decided to run and won the June Democratic primary with 72% of the vote. In the general election, she defeated Jim Klug 57%-43%. She won re-election in 2008 with 59% of the vote and 2010 with 55% of the vote.

Tenure
She was elected to as Speaker Pro Tempore of the legislature in 2009. The Vietnam Veterans of America Foundation-Montana Council selected her as "Legislator of the Year" in 2011. She is currently the Legislative Liaison to the Board of investments.

Committee assignments
House Education Committee
House Legislative Administration Committee 
House State Administration and Veterans Affairs Committee
House Capital Financial Advisory Committee (2008)
Legislative Liaison to Montana Board of Investments (2011–2012)
House Fish, Wildlife, and Parks Committee, Vice Chair 2013

2012 congressional election

In February 2011, Wilmer was the first candidate from either party to announce her candidacy for Montana's At-large congressional district in the U.S. House of Representatives in 2012. Wilmer was endorsed by the National Women's Political Caucus She finished second in the Democratic primary, with 14,836 votes (18.4%).

Personal life
Wilmer has lived in the city of Bozeman, Montana since 1991. She has one daughter.

Publications
The Indigenous Voice in World Politics (Sage 1993) 
The Social Construction of Man, the State and War: Identity, Conflict and Violence in Former Yugoslavia (Routledge 2002)
Human Rights in International Politics: An Introduction (Lynne Rienner 2015).

References

External links
Montana House of Representatives - Franke Wilmer Official MT State Legislature Website
Montana State University - Franke Wilmer Faculty Web Page
Project Vote Smart - Representative Franke Wilmer (MT) profile
Follow the Money - Franke Wilmer
2008 2006 campaign contributions
Franke Wilmer: 9 Questions with Montana’s Progressive State Representative about Occupy, Organized Labor, and Petitioning John Boehner on behalf of the 99%, Dan O'Mahony, "Point Nine Nine", November 5, 2011

Democratic Party members of the Montana House of Representatives
1950 births
Jewish American people in Montana politics
Living people
Shepherd University alumni
University of South Carolina Upstate faculty
University of Maryland, College Park alumni
Women state legislators in Montana
American women academics
21st-century American Jews
21st-century American women